Security Forces Headquarters – Mullaitivu (SFHQ-MLT) is a regional command of the Sri Lanka Army, that is responsible for the operational deployment and command all army units stationed in Mullaitivu District, this includes several divisions and the independent brigades. This a new command established to maintain control over newly recaptured area. It is one of the five Security Forces Headquarters and the General Officer Commanding it is one of the most senior officers in the army, the post is designated as Commander Security Forces Headquarters  - Mullaitivu. The current Commander SFHQ-MLT is Major General N A J C Dias WWV RWP RSP USP ndc. He assumed his duties as the Sixth Commander of the Security Force Headquarters (Mullaitivu) on 8 January 2014. The SFHQ-MLT is based at Mullaitivu.

Although it is primary a command of the Sri Lanka Army it coordinates operations and deployments of ground units of the Navy, Air Force and police with that of the army in that area.

Composition
 
59 Division, operating in the Mullaitivu District
591 Brigade
592 Brigade
593 Brigade
64 Division
641 Brigade
642 Brigade
643 Brigade
68 Division
681 Brigade
682 Brigade
683 Brigade

References

Commands of the Sri Lanka Army
Government of Mullaitivu District